River Lake is a Y-shaped natural freshwater lake on the southeast side of Winter Haven, Florida. It has a  surface area. This lake is as much a swamp as a lake, as at least half the surface area is covered with swampy vegetation. On the north and west residences line the lake's shore. On the southwest is a wooded area and on the south is a grove of citrus trees. To the east is a swampy area. Just east of the swampy area is a natural freshwater pond.

While there is no public access to this lake, the Hook and Bullet website says River Lake contains largemouth bass, bluegill and crappie.

References

Lakes of Polk County, Florida